is a Japanese actor and tarento.

Takahata graduated from Toho Gakuen College of Drama and Music. He is the eldest son of actress Atsuko Takahata and actor Ryosuke Otani, and his sister-in-law is actress Kotomi Takahata. Takahata is also related to Keiko Kitagawa and Daigo.

Biography
Takahata was a member of the baseball team at Gyosei International School. His position was catcher.

When he was in his third year at high school, he saw his mother, Atsuko, in the play A Streetcar Named Desire and was inspired to become an actor. He made his acting debut in the drama Akkoto Bokura ga Ikita Natsu in 2012. Later in April Takahata went to Toho Gakuen College of Drama and Music, the same college his mother graduated from, and studied theatre acting.

In 2015 he gained recognition when he appeared in the Asadora Mare. Takahata's reputation later increased as he appeared in a number of variety shows sometimes with his mother Atsuko.

On 23 August 2016 he was arrested by the Gunma Prefectural Police on charges of sexual assault against a female employee at a business hotel in Maebashi, where he stayed during movie shoot.

On 9 September 2016 at the Maebashi District Public Prosecutors Office, Takahata and the victim declared that the charges would be dropped. On the same day his manager, Mitsuzo Ishii Office, cancelled his contract, and he became independent.

On August 16, 2019, he continued his entertainment activities by appearing in the stage production of "Goodbye Nishiko-Kun".

Filmography

TV drama

Unscheduled due to scandal

Films

Cancelled due to scandal

Stage

Canceled due to scandal

Other TV programmes

Unscheduled due to scandal

Narration

Music videos

Advertisements

References

Notes

Sources

External links
  (Wayback Machine)

Japanese television personalities
Male actors from Tokyo
1993 births
Living people